The 2004–05 Oddset Ligaen season was the 48th season of ice hockey in Denmark. Nine teams participated in the league, and the Herning Blue Fox won the championship.

Regular season

Playoffs

External links
Season on hockeyarchives.info

Dan
2004 in Danish sport
2005 in Danish sport